Nakuru AllStars was a Kenyan football team. They won the first ever Kenyan Premier League in 1963, when managed by English coach Ray Bachelor. They repeated the feat again in 1969.

In 2010, a revived and reformed club, Nakuru AllStars, was formed.

References

1961 establishments in Kenya
Association football clubs established in 1961
Kenyan Premier League clubs
Sport in Rift Valley Province
Defunct football clubs in Kenya